Gomphiothrips is a genus of thrips in the family Phlaeothripidae.

Species
 Gomphiothrips mercedes
 Gomphiothrips tibouchinae

References

Phlaeothripidae
Thrips
Thrips genera